Allen Center is an unincorporated community in Allen Township, Union County, Ohio, United States.

History
Allen Center was laid out around 1849. A post office was established at Allen Center in 1851, and remained in operation until 1863.

References 

Unincorporated communities in Union County, Ohio
Unincorporated communities in Ohio